Werner Kriess (born 6 September 1947) is an Austrian former footballer and manager. He played in 15 matches for the Austria national football team from 1971 to 1975.

References

External links
 

1947 births
Living people
Austrian footballers
Austria international footballers
Place of birth missing (living people)
Association footballers not categorized by position
Austrian football managers
FC Blau-Weiß Linz managers